Tobias Pachonik (born 4 January 1995) is a German professional footballer who plays as a right-back.

Club career 
Pachonik joined 1. FC Nürnberg in 2010 from TSG Thannhausen. He made his Bundesliga debut at 3 May 2014 against Hannover 96. He substituted Hiroshi Kiyotake after 56 minutes in a 2–0 home defeat.

International career
Pachonik has represented Germany at under-19 and under-20 level.

References

External links

1995 births
Living people
People from Marktoberdorf
Sportspeople from Swabia (Bavaria)
Footballers from Bavaria
German footballers
Association football fullbacks
Germany youth international footballers
1. FC Nürnberg players
1. FC Nürnberg II players
Stuttgarter Kickers players
FC Schalke 04 II players
A.C. Carpi players
VVV-Venlo players
Bundesliga players
2. Bundesliga players
3. Liga players
Regionalliga players
Serie B players
Eredivisie players
German expatriate footballers
German expatriate sportspeople in Italy
Expatriate footballers in Italy
German expatriate sportspeople in the Netherlands
Expatriate footballers in the Netherlands